"Heart Trouble" was the third official release by the Detroit soul group The Parliaments. Released in 1965 by Golden World Records (GW-46), it was the only single the Parliaments recorded for the label.

In 1965, the Parliaments' line up (which continued until 1977) was George Clinton, Grady Thomas, Ray Davis, Fuzzy Haskins and Calvin Simon.

"Heart Trouble" was later re-worked in 1973 under the title "You Can't Miss What You Can't Measure", featured on the Funkadelic album Cosmic Slop. Another version was recorded about three years earlier, yet did not surface until the 2008 release of the CD "Toys". The B-side, "That Was My Girl", was re-recorded in 1972 and featured on America Eats Its Young.

The Parliaments songs
1965 songs
Songs written by George Clinton (funk musician)